Love Stinks is a 1999 American screwball dark comedy film written and directed by Jeff Franklin and starring French Stewart, Bridgette Wilson, Bill Bellamy and Tyra Banks.

Plot
Seth, a sitcom writer-producer, meets Chelsea, an interior decorator, at his best friend Larry's wedding. He's immediately sexually attracted to her while she's instantly attracted to his single-ness. They both ditch their wedding dates and start their own date that same night.

Chelsea tells Seth she has one rule: she won't have sex until they have had at least three meals together. He proceeds to speed date through the evening ensuring that they actually eat three meals. Chelsea agrees to sleep with him, but only for a commitment to exclusivity. Seth is alarmed, but agrees and they end up having wild sex in the showroom of Chelsea’s job.

They become a couple, and seem fairly happy but Seth increasingly realizes that Chelsea is short-tempered and manipulative. She tells him she loves him after only four weeks and when Seth doesn't immediately reciprocate, Chelsea nearly storms out. Panicking, he says he loves her. She uses her cat's disappearance as an excuse to move in to Seth's, and it reappears a few days later.

On a Valentine's Day getaway, Seth gives Chelsea jewelry as a gift and she expected a proposal. He insists it's far too early for them to consider getting married, and when she disagrees they strike a deal to get engaged in one year if things feel right.

Over the next year, Seth and Chelsea fight frequently, reconciling with make-up sex. On Valentine's Day, Chelsea is clearly expecting a proposal and is apoplectic when Seth gives her diamond earrings instead. As they'd had a rocky year, proposing still doesn't feel right. She shouts and curses, ending their relationship, throwing the earrings into the ocean.

Seth briefly is relieved that things are over, but Chelsea quickly files a palimony lawsuit and moves back into his house to claim half of what he owns. She tortures him by filling the house with rescue cats, knowing he's allergic, and puts hair removal cream in his shampoo, forcing him to wear a wig. Seth retaliates by farting excessively in bed and kidnapping her cat, then tricking Chelsea to jump into filthy water by pretending to throw the cat over the edge of a pier.

They briefly come to an agreement without their lawyers, christened with hate sex. However, her lawyer convinces Chelsea to renege and files a restraining order against Seth to force him out of the house. He goes to stay with Larry, but when Chelsea turns up to visit Larry's wife, Holly, the ensuing argument leads to Holly kicking both men out.

Pushed to his breaking point, Seth kidnaps Chelsea and takes her to a planetarium, where she assumes he's going to murder her. However, he proposes with the ring she had previously asked for and Chelsea accepts. He gets it appraised, sells his house so they can start anew in another home and convinces Chelsea to marry in Las Vegas. This because noone would support them after everything that's happened. They'll renew their vows later with a big ceremony.

Larry attempts to convince Seth to call it off, but he refuses and the wedding goes on in Las Vegas. However, when he is supposed to say, "I do," he instead says, "I don't think so," and has a security guard stay hold back Chelsea. He reveals that the proposal and wedding were a ploy to get her to drop her lawsuit, noting that she'd also now moved out of his home. Seth's dentist and assistant had posed as a married couple and purchased the house, which they will sell back to him, and he had bribed a jeweler to appraise Chelsea's fake engagement ring. Seth triumphantly dances down the aisle, and Chelsea furiously grabs the guard's gun and shoots him in his backside.

Police arrest Chelsea and an ambulance takes Seth away, who loudly declares that he's now "full-on Liberace" gay after his time with her. Larry and Holy conclude that they “need new friends.” As the ambulance drives away, Seth recants his coming out and Chelsea rants to the arresting officer, who replies, "Don't make me gag you, ma'am."

Cast

Reception

Critical reception
Upon its release, Love Stinks received negative reviews from critics. On Rotten Tomatoes, the film has an approval rating of 19% based on 47 reviews and an average rating of 3.46/10. The site's critical consensus reads, "This one-dimensional comedy with recycled laughs will have you holding your nose." On Metacritic, the film has a score of 23 out of 100, indicating "generally unfavorable reviews".

Soundtrack
 Love Stinks – Andru Branch
 Let's Get It On – Marvin Gaye
 Can't Help Falling in Love – Elvis Presley
 I Promise – B. Chevis
 Glaym Lyfe – Shady Montage
 Fairy Tales – Kevin Perez
 Why Ya Wanna Do Me (Like This) – Chip Allen
 Playa Wayz – Andre Branch
 This Thing Called Love – Jonathan Douglas
 Na, Na, Na – Brion James
 I Feel Good – Alexander

References

External links

Love Stinks: Music From And Inspired By The Motion Picture

1999 films
1999 romantic comedy films
American romantic comedy films
1999 directorial debut films
1990s English-language films
1990s American films